Marcus Trevelyan Martin (29 April 1842 – 5 June 1908) was an English first-class cricketer active 1861–70 who played for Middlesex, Marylebone Cricket Club (MCC) and Cambridge University. He was born in Barrackpore; he died in Marylebone.

References

1842 births
1908 deaths
English cricketers
Middlesex cricketers
Marylebone Cricket Club cricketers
Cambridge University cricketers
Gentlemen of the North cricketers
Gentlemen of the South cricketers